KD Lekir is the second ship of  corvette currently serving in the Royal Malaysian Navy. Together with her sister ship Kasturi, Lekir serves in the 22nd Corvette Squadron of the Royal Malaysian Navy.

Construction and career
Lekir was built by the German Howaldtswerke-Deutsche Werft (HDW) shipyard. She was launched on 14 May 1983 and commissioned on 15 August 1984. 

In October 2011, Lekir underwent an extensive modernisation known as Service Life Extension Program (SLEP) and it was completed in November 2014. Like her sister ship Kasturi, the upgraded consisted of TACTICOS Combat Management System from Thales to replace the older Signaal SEWACO MA command system. The DR3000S Electronic Support Measures suite and Therma SKWS Decoy Launching System were also installed. The DA-08 search radar and the WM22 fire control radar were overhauled and the Thales MIRADOR electro-optical sensor replaced the Signaal LIOD optronic director. For anti-submarine warfare, a DSQS-24C hull-mounted sonar from Atlas Elektronik was installed to complement the new torpedo-launch capabilities.

During Exercise Taming Sari 21/2022 that took place between 16 and 20 May 2022 in the Strait of Malacca, Lekir live-fired an Exocet MM40 missile.

Lekir fired the Exocet MM40 missile during the Rim of the Pacific (RIMPAC) exercise that took place between 29 June until 4 August 2022 off Hawaii.

References

Kasturi-class corvettes
Corvettes of Malaysia
1983 ships
Corvettes of the Cold War
Ships built in Bremen (state)